This list includes significant mountain peaks and high points located in the United States arranged alphabetically by state, district, or territory. The highest peak or point in each state, district or territory is noted in bold.

Significant mountain peaks and high points

Alabama

Brindley Mountain
Cheaha Mountain, highest summit in the State of Alabama
Monte Sano Mountain
Capshaw Mountain
Dirtseller Mountain
Frog Mountain
Hawk Pride Mountain
Gunters Mountain
Sand Mountain (Alabama)
Keel Mountain (Alabama)
Halama Mountain

Alaska

 Afognak Mountain, summit of Afognak Island
 Alagogshak
 Amak Volcano, active stratovolcano
 Amherst Peak
 Amulet Peak
 Andy Simons Mountain
 Annex Peak
 Anvil Peak  , active stratovolcano that forms the summit of Semisopochnoi Island
 Arthur Peak
 Asses Ears (Alaska)
 Atna Peaks 
 Atuk Mountain , summit of St. Lawrence Island
 Augustine Volcano, active lava dome that forms the summit of Augustine Island
 Auke Mountain
 Baranof Island High Point , summit of Baranof Island
 Bard Peak
 Bashful Peak
 Bear Mountain
 Begich Peak
 Benign Peak
 Black Cap Mountain
 Black Mountain
 Black Mountain , highest summit of the De Long Mountains
 Black Peak
 Blackthorn Peak
 Boggs Peak
 Bonanza Peak
 Buldir Volcano , stratovolcano that forms the summit of Buldir Island
 Bullard Mountain
 Calliope Mountain
 Cantata Peak
 Carlisle Peak, active stratovolcano that forms the summit of Carlisle Island
 Carpathian Peak
 Castle Mountain
 Castle Peak
 Cathedral Peak
 Cecil Rhode Mountain
 Chichagof Island High Point, summit of Chichagof Island
 Chitistone Mountain
 Cleveland Volcano  , active stratovolcano that forms the summit of Chuginadak Island
 Cloud Peak , highest summit of the Philip Smith Mountains
 Cold Bay Volcano
 Columbia Peak
 De Long Mountains High Point 
 Debauch Mountain 
 Denali (Mount McKinley) , highest summit of the Alaska Range, the State of Alaska, the United States of America, and all of North America
 Devils Paw 
 Dillingham High Point 
 Dillon Mountain
 Divide Mountain
 Donoho Peak
 Double Peak
 Eagle Peak, on Admiralty Island
 Eagle Peak, in Chugach Mountains
 East Peak
 Ellamar Mountain
 Emperor Peak
 Face Mountain
 Fang Mountain
 Fireweed Mountain
 Flat Top Mountain (Sitka City and Borough, Alaska)
 Flattop Mountain (Anchorage, Alaska)
 Frosty Peak , stratovolcano
 Girls Mountain
 Goat Mountain
 Granite Peak
 Granite Range High Point 
 Great Nunatak
 Great Sitkin Volcano , active stratovolcano that forms the summit of Great Sitkin Island
 Guardian Mountain
 Gunsight Mountain
 Hanagita Peak  
 Heintzleman Ridge
 Hess Mountain
 Highbush Peak
 Hinchinbrook Island High Point, summit of Hinchinbrook Island
 Hogback Ridge
 Horn Spire
 Isanotski Peaks , stratovolcano
 Isthmus Peak 
 Joshua Green Peak
 Kates Needle 
 Kejulik Volcano
 Kichatna Spire 
 Kings Mountain
 Kiska Volcano 
 Knight Island High Point, summit of Knight Island
 Koniag Peak , summit of Kodiak Island
 Korovin Volcano , active stratovolcano forms the summit of Atka Island
 Lingon Mountain
 Lions Head Mountain
 London Tower
 Lowell Peak
 Makushin Volcano , active stratovolcano
 Mammary Peak
 Mangy Hill
 Marble Mountain
 Matanuska Peak
 Maynard Mountain
 McGinnis Mountain
 McGinnis Peak
 McHugh Peak
 Mentasta Mountains High Point 
 Meteorite Mountain
 Moby Dick
 Montague Island High Point, summit of Montague Island
 Mount Abbe
 Mount Abdallah
 Mount Adagdak, stratovolcano
 Mount Adair
 Mount Akutan , active stratovolcano that forms the summit of Akutan Island
 Mount Alice
 Mount Alpenglow
 Mount Alverstone 
 Mount Amukta, active stratovolcano
 Mount Angayukaqsraq , highest summit of the Baird Mountains
 Mount Aniakchak, active stratovolcano
 Mount Ascension
 Mount Augusta 
 Mount Barrille
 Mount Bassie
 Mount Bayard
 Mount Bear 
 Mount Bendeleben
 Mount Benson
 Mount Bertha
 Mount Blachnitzky
 Mount Blackburn  , highest summit of the Wrangell Mountains
 Mount Bona 
 Mount Bradley
 Mount Bradley (Mount Jumbo)
 Mount Cameron
 Mount Carlisle, active stratovolcano
 Mount Carmack
 Mount Case
 Mount Castner
 Mount Chamberlin , highest summit of the Brooks Range and the Arctic United States
 Mount Chiginagak , active stratovolcano
 Mount Chitina
 Mount Cook (Saint Elias Mountains) 
 Mount Cooper
 Mount Crillon 
 Mount Dagelet
 Mount Deborah 
 Mount Defiant
 Mount Douglas , active stratovolcano
 Mount Drum , stratovolcano
 Mount Dutton, active stratovolcano
 Mount Edgecumbe, stratovolcano that forms the summit of Kruzof Island
 Mount Edison
 Mount Eielson
 Mount Einstein
 Mount Elusive
 Mount Emmons
 Mount Ernest Gruening
 Mount Etolin, summit of Etolin Island
 Mount Fairweather (Fairweather Mountain) 
 Mount Foraker 
 Mount Forde
 Mount Foresta 
 Mount Frances
 Mount Francis
 Mount Gareloi, active stratovolcano that forms the summit of Gareloi Island. Westernmost ultra-prominent summit of greater North America.
 Mount Gilbert, volcano that forms the summit of Akun Island
 Mount Gilbert (Chugach Mountains)
 Mount Glenn
 Mount Golub
 Mount Goode
 Mount Grace
 Mount Griggs , active stratovolcano
 Mount Grosvenor
 Mount Grosvenor (Alaska Range)
 Mount Harding
 Mount Harper 
 Mount Hayes , stratovolcano remnant
 Mount Healy
 Mount Hesperus 
 Mount Hogan
 Mount Hubbard 
 Mount Hunter 
 Mount Huntington
 Mount Huxley
 Mount Igikpak , highest summit of the Schwatka Mountains
 Mount Iliamna, active stratovolcano
 Mount Jarvis 
 Mount Johnson
 Mount Juneau
 Mount Kagamil, active stratovolcano that forms the summit of Kagamil Island
 Mount Kaguyak, stratovolcano
 Mount Kanaga, active stratovolcano that forms the summit of Kanaga Island
 Mount Katmai, active stratovolcano
 Mount Kialagvik
 Mount Kimball 
 Mount Kiska, active stratovolcano that forms the summit of Kiska Island
 Mount Kudlich
 Mount La Perouse
 Mount Mageik, active volcano
 Mount Marcus Baker 
 Mount Martin, active stratovolcano
 Mount Mather 
 Mount McGinnis
 Mount Merriam
 Mount Michelson (Brooks Range)
 Mount Michelson (Chugach Mountains)
 Mount Miller 
 Mount Moffett, stratovolcano that forms the summit of Adak Island
 Mount Muir
 Mount Nagishlamina
 Mount Natazhat 
 Mount Neacola 
 Mount Okmok, active shield volcano
 Mount O'Neel
 Mount Osborn  
 Mount Palmer
 Mount Pavlof , active stratovolcano
 Mount POW/MIA
 Mount Prindle 
 Mount Queena
 Mount Quincy Adams (Fairweather Range)
 Mount Recheshnoi, active stratovolcano
 Mount Redoubt  , active stratovolcano that forms the highest summit of the Chigmit Mountains
 Mount Reid, summit of Revillagigedo Island
 Mount Ripinski
 Mount Robert Barron
 Mount Roberts
 Mount Rumble
 Mount Russell 
 Mount Saint Elias , highest summit of Wrangell-St. Elias National Park and Preserve and the second highest summit of both the United States and Canada
 Mount Sanford , volcano
 Mount Seattle 
 Mount Seguam, active stratovolcano
 Mount Shand
 Mount Shishaldin , active stratovolcano that forms the summit of Unimak Island
 Mount Silverthrone 
 Mount Spurr, active stratovolcano
 Mount Steller (Chugach Mountains)  , stratovolcano
 Mount Susitna
 Mount Thomas
 Mount Tom White 
 Mount Torbert 
 Mount Tozi 
 Mount Turner
 Mount Vancouver
 Mount Veniaminof , active stratovolcano
 Mount Vsevidof , active stratovolcano that forms the summit of Umnak Island
 Mount Wake
 Mount Watson
 Mount Westdahl, active volcano
 Mount Wickersham
 Mount Williams
 Mount Williwaw
 Mount Witherspoon
 Mount Wordie
 Mount Wrangell , active shield volcano
 Mount Wrather
 Novarupta, active lava dome
 Nugget Mountain
 Nugget Towers
 O'Malley Peak
 Passage Peak
 Pavlof Sister, stratovolcano
 Peak 5390
 Peak 6200
 Peak 6915
 Peak 8010 
 Peak 8084 
 Peak 8336 
 Peak 8488 
 Pease Peak
 Penguin Peak
 Phoenix Peak
 Pilot Peak
 Pioneer Peak
 Pogromni Volcano  
 Polar Bear Peak
 Polychrome Mountain
 Porphyry Mountain
 Portage Peak
 Poss Mountain
 Prince of Wales Island High Point , summit of Prince of Wales Island
 Princess Peak
 Pyramid Mountain
 Pyramid Peak
 Pyre Peak , summit of Seguam Island
 Radio Control Tower
 Regal Mountain  
 Resurrection Peaks
 Rhino Peak
 Sanak Peak, summit of Sanak Island
 Scott Peak
 Segula Peak, stratovolcano that forms the summit of Segula Island
 Sentinel Peak
 Sheep Mountain
 Shishaldin Volcano, see Mount Shishaldin
 Sinclair Mountain
 Slanting Peak
 Snider Peak
 Snowden Mountain
 Snowpatch Crag
 Snow Tower 
 Sourdough Peak
 Sovereign Mountain 
 Split Thumb
 Stroller White Mountain
 Sugar Loaf Mountain
 Sukakpak Mountain
 Taku Towers
 Tanaga Volcano , active stratovolcano that forms the summit of Tanaga Island
 Tazlina Tower
 The Mitre
 The Ramp
 The Rooster Comb
 The Snow Towers
 Thibodeaux Mountain, highest summit of the Endicott Mountains
 Tokosha Mountains
 Tressider Peak 
 Trident Volcano , active stratovolcano
 Truuli Peak 
 Tukgahgo Mountain
 Twin Peaks
 Ugashik-Peulik, active stratovolcano
 Ultima Thule Peak
 University Peak 
 Kusilvak High Point 
 Wiki Peak
 Williams Peak
 Wolverine Peak
 Yantarni Volcano

American Samoa

 A‘oloaufou
 Lata Mountain, summit of the Island of Ta‘ū and the highest summit of the Territory of American Samoa
 Matafao Peak, summit of the Island of Tutuila
 Piumafua, summit of the Island of Olosega
 Rainmaker Mountain (North Pioa Mountain)
 Tumu, summit of the Island of Ofu

Arizona

 Agassiz Peak
 Agathla Peak
 Ajo Peak
 Alsap Butte
 Angels Gate
 Baboquivari Peak
 Mount Baldy
 Mount Bigelow
 Black Mesa (western Arizona)
 Brady Peak
 Brahma Temple
 Camelback Mountain
 Castor Temple
 Chiricahua Peak
 Chuar Butte
 Comanche Point
 Confucius Temple
 Coyote Buttes
 Daisy Mountain
 Diamond Peak
 Diana Temple
 Doyle Peak
 Escudilla Mountain
 Evans Butte
 Fan Island
 Four Peaks
 Fremont Peak
 Freya Castle
 Geikie Peak
 Granite Mountain
 Gu Achi Peak
 Holy Grail Temple
 Hualapai Peak
 Humphreys Peak, highest summit of the State of Arizona
 Jupiter Temple
 Kaibab Plateau High Point
 Kendrick Peak
 King Arthur Castle
 Kitt Peak
 Lyell Butte
 Miller Peak
 Mingus Mountain
 Mount Ajo
 Mount Elden
 Mount Graham
 Mount Hayden
 Mount Hopkins
 Mount Huethawali
 Mount Lemmon
 Mount Sinyella
 Mount Tipton
 Mount Union
 Mount Wrightson
 Navajo Mountain
 Picketpost Mountain
 Piestewa Peak
 Pollux Temple
 Pusch Ridge
 Ragged Top
 Red Butte
 Roof Butte
 San Francisco Peaks, four highest summits of Arizona
 Sentinel Peak (A Mountain)
 Shiva Temple
 SP Crater
 Steamboat Mountain
 Sunnyslope Mountain
 Sunset Crater
 Superstition Mountain
 Tempe Butte
 Thimble Peak
 Thompson Peak
 Thor Temple
 Vishnu Temple
 Zoroaster Temple

Arkansas
 Mount Magazine, highest summit of the State of Arkansas
 Glazypeau Mountain
 Petit Jean

California

 Acker Peak
 Acrodectes Peak
 Adams Peak
 Alamo Mountain
 Amelia Earhart Peak
 Anderson Peak
 Anderson Peak (Placer County)
 Aperture Peak
 Arlington Peak
 Ash Creek Butte
 Avawatz Peak
 Babbitt Peak
 Bald Eagle Mountain
 Bear Mountain
 Big Maria Mountains High Point
 Big Pine Mountain
 Birch Mountain
 Black Butte (Chocolate Mountains)
 Black Butte (Northern California Coast Range)
 Black Giant
 Black Kaweah
 Black Mountain
 Black Mountain (Mono County)
 Black Mountain
 Blacktop Peak
 Boulder Peak
 Breckenridge Mountain
 Brown Peak
 Bully Choop Mountain
 Burney Mountain
 Burnt Peak
 Butt Mountain
 Cady Peak
 Cahto Peak
 Calabasas Peak
 Caltech Peak
 Camiaca Peak
 Cardinal Mountain
 Carson Peak
 Castle Peak
 Cathedral Peak
 Center Peak
 Chanchelulla Peak
 Chews Ridge
 Cinder Cone
 Cirque Peak
 Clark Mountain
 Cloudripper
 Clyde Spires
 Cobb Mountain
 Cobblestone Mountain
 Colosseum Mountain
 Columbine Peak
 Cone Peak
 Copernicus Peak
 Coso Peak
 Cottonwood Peak
 Cow Mountain
 Coyote Mountain
 Crater Mountain
 Crater Peak
 Crown Point
 Crystal Crag
 Cuyamaca Peak
 Devils Crags
 Devils Peak, summit of Santa Cruz Island and highest summit of the Channel Islands of California
 Dicks Butte
 Dicks Peak
 Disappointment Peak
 Dixie Mountain
 Donner Peak
 Double Mountain
 Double Peak (San Diego County, California)
 Dragon Peak
 Dry Mountain
 Eagle Crags
 Eagle Mountain
 Eagle Peak
 East Vidette
 Edgar Peak
 El Capitan
 Elephants Back
 Elsinore Peak
 Emerald Peak
 Eocene Peak
 Epidote Peak
 Estelle Mountain
 Feather Peak
 Fin Dome
 Finger Peaks
 Fletcher Peak
 Four Gables
 Fox Mountain
 Frazier Mountain
 Fredonyer Peak
 Freel Peak
 Fremont Peak
 Fresno Dome
 Funeral Peak
 Gabbro Peak
 Gale Peak
 Gaylor Peak
 Gemini
 George R. Stewart Peak
 Gilcrest Peak
 Giraud Peak
 Glass Mountain
 Goat Mountain
 Goodale Mountain
 Goosenest
 Grand Sentinel
 Granite Dome
 Granite Mountain (Riverside County, California)
 Granite Mountain (San Bernardino County, California)
 Granite Peak (Trinity County, California)
 Graveyard Peak
 Gray Peak
 Grouse Mountain
 Half Dome
 Hawkins Peak
 Hawksbeak Peak
 Hayfork Bally
 Herlihy Peak
 Highland Peak
 Hines Peak
 Hoosimbim Mountain
 Hot Springs Mountain
 Hot Springs Peak
 Hull Mountain
 Hunewill Peak
 Hurd Peak
 Incredible Hulk
 Independence Peak
 Indian Creek Baldy
 Iron Mountain (Ritter Range)
 Iron Peak
 Jakes Peak
 Jobs Peak
 Jobs Sister
 Joe Devel Peak
 Junipero Serra Peak
 Kearsarge Peak
 Kearsarge Pinnacles
 Keddie Peak
 Kennedy Mountain
 Kennedy Peak
 Kern Peak
 Kern Point
 Kettle Benchmark
 Kettle Peak
 Keynot Peak
 King Peak
 Kingston Peak
 Kuna Peak
 La Cumbre Peak
 Langille Peak
 Lassen Peak, active lava dome
 Last Chance Mountain
 Leavitt Peak
 Lee Vining Peak
 Lembert Dome
 Liberty Cap
 Lion Rock
 Lippincott Mountain
 Loma Prieta
 Lookout Peak
 Lyon Peak
 Madera Peak
 Maggies Peak
 Mammoth Mountain
 Manly Peak
 Marion Peak
 Matterhorn Peak
 Maturango Peak
 Medicine Lake Volcano, shield volcano
 Merriam Peak
 Middle Palisade
 Midway Mountain
 Minarets
 Mission Peak
 Mokelumne Peak
 Montgomery Peak
 Mount Abbot
 Mount Ansel Adams
 Mount Baden-Powell
 Mount Bago
 Mount Baldwin
 Mount Baxter
 Mount Bolton Brown
 Mount Bradley (Inyo County, California)
 Mount Bradley (Siskiyou County, California)
 Mount Carillon
 Mount Carl Heller
 Mount Cedric Wright
 Mount Chamberlin (California)
 Mount Conness
 Mount Corcoran
 Mount Crocker
 Mount Dade
 Mount Dana
 Mount Darwin
 Mount Davis
 Mount Diablo
 Mount Disappointment
 Mount Dubois
 Mount Eddy, highest summit of the Klamath Mountains
 Mount Eisen
 Mount Fiske
 Mount Gabb
 Mount Gayley
 Mount Genevra
 Mount Gibbs
 Mount Gilbert
 Mount Goode
 Mount Haeckel
 Mount Hale
 Mount Hamilton
 Mount Harrington
 Mount Henry
 Mount Hilgard
 Mount Hitchcock
 Mount Hoffman
 Mount Hoffmann
 Mount Hood
 Mount Hooper
 Mount Hopkins
 Mount Humphreys
 Mount Huntington
 Mount Ickes
 Mount Ingalls
 Mount Izaak Walton
 Mount Jepson
 Mount Johnson
 Mount Jordan
 Mount Judah
 Mount Julius Caesar
 Mount Kaweah
 Mount Keith
 Mount Lamarck
 Mount Langley
 Mount Lassic, (Signal Mountain)
 Mount Lee
 Mount Lewis
 Mount Lincoln
 Mount Lola
 Mount Lyell
 Mount McGee
 Mount McDuffie
 Mount Mills
 Mount Morgan (Inyo County, California)
 Mount Morgan (Mono County, California)
 Mount Morrison
 Mount Muir
 Mount Newcomb
 Mount Orizaba, summit of Santa Catalina Island
 Mount Patterson
 Mount Perkins
 Mount Pickering
 Mount Pinchot
 Mount Pinos
 Mount Powell
 Mount Prater
 Mount Randy Morgenson
 Mount Reinstein
 Mount Ritter
 Mount Rixford
 Mount Robinson
 Mount Ruskin
 Mount Russell
 Mount San Antonio, known locally as Mount Baldy
 Mount San Gorgonio
 Mount Scowden
 Mount Senger
 Mount Shakspere
 Mount Shasta - active stratovolcano that is the highest summit of the California Cascade Range
 Mount Shinn
 Mount Sill
 Mount Stanford (North)
 Mount Stanford (South)
 Mount Starr
 Mount Tallac
 Mount Tamalpais
 Mount Thompson
 Mount Tinemaha
 Mount Tom
 Mount Tyndall
 Mount Umunhum
 Mount Veeder
 Mount Versteeg
 Mount Wallace
 Mount Warlow
 Mount Warren
 Mount Whitney, highest summit of the Sierra Nevada, the State of California, and the contiguous United States
 Mount Williamson
 Mount Wilson
 Mount Wood
 Mount Wynne
 Mount Young
 Muriel Peak
 Needle Peak
 Negro Butte
 New York Mountains High Point
 Night Cap Peak
 Nopah Range High Point
 North Guard
 North Palisade
 North Yolla Bolly Mountain
 Observation Peak
 Olancha Peak
 Old Woman Mountains
 Ord Mountains
 Owens Peak
 Page Peaks
 Painted Lady
 Palomar Mountain
 Parker Peak
 Peter Peak
 Pickaninny Buttes
 Picket Guard Peak
 Picture Peak
 Picture Puzzle
 Pilot Knob (Fresno County)
 Piute Peak
 Pointless Peak
 Potato Peak
 Preston Peak
 Pyramid Peak
 Pyramid Peak (Fresno County)
 Quail Mountain
 Rafferty Peak
 Rainbow Ridge
 Raymond Peak
 Recess Peak
 Red and White Mountain
 Red Kaweah
 Red Peak (El Dorado County, California)
 Red Peak (Madera County, California)
 Red Slate Mountain
 Resting Spring Range High Point
 Reyes Peak
 Reynolds Peak
 Robinson Peak
 Round Top
 Royce Peak
 Russian Peak
 Salmon Mountain
 San Benito Mountain
 San Gorgonio Mountain, highest summit of the Transverse Ranges
 San Jacinto Peak
 San Mateo Peak
 San Rafael Mountains
 Sandstone Peak
 Sanhedrin Mountain
 Santa Ynez Peak
 Santiago Peak
 Sawmill Point
 Scylla
 Seven Gables
 Sheep Hole Mountains High Point
 Sierra Buttes
 Silver Peak (El Dorado County)
 Silver Peak (Fresno County)
 Sirretta Peak
 Slate Mountain
 Smith Peak
 Snow Mountain
 Sonora Peak
 South Butte
 South Guard
 South Yolla Bolly Mountain, highest summit of the Northern California Coast Range
 Spectre Peak
 Split Mountain
 Stanton Peak
 State Peak
 Stevens Peak
 Straw Peak
 Striped Mountain
 Telescope Peak
 The Citadel
 The Hermit
 The Sphinx
 The Three Chimneys
 The Thumb
 Thirst Benchmark, summit of San Clemente Island
 Thompson Peak
 Thor Peak
 Thunderbolt Peak
 Tiefort Mountains High Point
 Tinker Knob
 Tin Mountain
 Toro Peak
 Tower Peak
 Trojan Peak
 Tunnabora Peak
 Turtle Mountains High Point
 Twin Peaks (Placer County)
 Twin Peaks
 Vandever Mountain
 Vennacher Needle
 Victoria Peak
 Volcanic Ridge
 Warren Peak
 Waucoba Mountain
 Wells Peak
 West Vidette
 Whaleback
 Whale Peak
 Wheel Mountain
 Whipple Mountains High Point
 White Mountain Peak
 Widow Mountain
 Willow Creek Mountain
 Ycatapom Peak

Colorado

Abrams Mountain 12,801'
Ajax Peak 12,785'
American Peak 13,806'
Anthracite Range High Point 12,394'
Antora Peak 13,275'
Argentine Peak 13,743'
Arrow Peak 13,809'
Aspen Mountain 10,705'
Atlantic Peak
Badger Mountain 11,295'
Bald Mountain 13,690'
Bard Peak 13,647'
Bear Peak 8,459'
Bennett Peak 13,209'
Berrian Mountain 9,151'
Bill Williams Peak 13,389' – highest summit of the Williams Mountains
Bison Mountain 12,432' – highest summit of the Tarryall Mountains
Black Mountain (Elkhead Mountains) 10,865'
Black Mountain (South Park Hills) 11,649'
Blair Mountain 11,465' – highest summit of the White River Plateau
Blanca Peak 14,351' – highest summit of the Sangre de Cristo Mountains
Blanco Point 12,033'
Blodgett Peak 9,444'
Braddock Peak 11,972'
Buffalo Peak 11,594'
Bushnell Peak 13,110'
Calf Creek Plateau 12,661'
California Peak 13,855'
Cannibal Plateau 12,533'
Capitol Peak 14,137'
Carbon Peak 12,088'
Carbonate Mountain 13,670'
Casco Peak 13,915'
Castle Peak (Elk Mountains) 14,279' – highest summit of the Elk Mountains
Castle Peak (Sawatch Range) 11,305'
Castle Rock (San Juan Mountains) 11,458'
Cathedral Peak 13,950'
Chair Mountain 12,727'
Chalk Benchmark 12,038'
Challenger Point 14,087'
Cheyenne Mountain 9,570'
Chicago Peak 13,385'
Chief Cheley Peak 12,809'
Chimney Rock 11,781'
Cirque Mountain 13,686'
Clark Peak 12,960' – highest summit of the Medicine Bow Mountains
Clinton Peak 13,864'
Cochetopa Dome 11,138'
Columbia Point 13,986'
Columbus Mountain 10,258'
Conejos Peak 13,179'
Conundrum Peak 14,067'
Courthouse Mountain 12,152'
Coxcomb Peak 13,656'
Crater Peak 11,333' – highest summit of Grand Mesa
Crested Butte 12,168'
Crestone Needle 14,203'
Crestone Peak 14,300' – highest summit of the Crestones
Crestone East Peak 14,266'
Cronin Peak 13,877'
Crystal Peak 13,859'
Culebra Peak 14,053' – highest summit of the Culebra Range
Dallas Peak 13,815'
Darley Mountain 13,260'
Dawson Butte 7,474'
De Anza Peak (Culebra Range)
De Anza Peak (Sangre de Cristo Range)
Devils Head 9,749'
Devils Playground 13,075'
Diamond Peak 9,665'
Dolores Peak 13,296'
Dunsinane Mountain 12,742'
Dyer Mountain 13,862'
East Beckwith Mountain 12,441'
East Spanish Peak 12,688'
El Diente Peak 14,165'
Eldorado Mountain 8,344'
Electric Peak (San Juan Mountains)
Electric Peak (Sangre de Cristo Range)
Elk Mountain 11,424' (Rabbit Ears Range)
Elk Mountain 8,727' (Elkhead Mountains)
Ellingwood Point 14,048'
Elliott Mountain 12,346'
Emerald Peak 13,911'
Engelmann Peak 13,368'
Engineer Mountain 12,968'
Fairchild Mountain 13,508'
Fishers Peak 9,633' – highest summit of Raton Mesa and easternmost summit of the Rocky Mountains
Flagstaff Mountain 6,983'
Flat Top Mountain 12,361' – highest summit of the Flat Tops
Fletcher Mountain 13,958'
French Mountain 13,966'
Garfield Peak 13,787'
Gemini Peak
Gilpin Peak 13,700'
Gladstone Peak 13,919'
Goat Hill 5,604'
Golden Horn 13,780'
Gothic Mountain 12,631'
Graham Peak 12,536'
Grand Hogback
Grannys Nipple
Grays Peak 14,278' – highest summit of the Front Range and highest point on the Continental Divide of North America
Green Mountain (Front Range) 8,148'
Green Mountain (Front Range Rhills) 6,854'
Green Mountain (Kenosha Mountains) 10,427'
Greenhorn Mountain 12,352' – highest summit of the Wet Mountains
Greyrock Mountain 7,616'
Grizzly Peak (Collegiate Peaks) 13,995'
Grizzly Peak (Front Range) 13,433'
Grizzly Peak (Needle Mountains)
Grizzly Peak (San Juan Mountains)
Grizzly Peak (Sawatch Range)
Hagerman Peak
Hahns Peak 10,843'
Hagues Peak 13,573'
Half Peak 13,848' – highest summit of the East Central San Juan Mountains
Hallett Peak 12,720'
Handies Peak 14,058'
Hayden Peak (Sneffels Range) 12,987'
Hayden Spire 12,480'
Henry Mountain 13,261'
Hesperus Mountain 13,237' – highest summit of the La Plata Mountains
Horse Mountain 9,952'
Horsefly Peak 10,353' – highest summit of the Uncompahgre Plateau
Horseshoe Mountain 13,905'
Horsetooth Mountain 7,259'
Huerfano Butte 6,174'
Humboldt Peak 14,070'
Huntsman Ridge 11,858'
Huron Peak 14,012'
Hurricane Peak 13,447'
Ice Mountain 13,958'
Iowa Peak
Iron Mountain (Never Summer Mountains) 12,270'
Iron Mountain (Sangre de Cristo Range) 11,416'
Italian Mountain 13,385'
Jacque Peak 13,211'
Jagged Mountain 13,830'
James Peak 13,299'
Jones Mountain 13,866'
Jupiter Mountain 13,836'
Kit Carson Mountain 14,171'
Knights Peak 10499'
Knobby Crest 12,434' – highest summit of the Kenosha Mountains
La Plata Peak 14,343' – fifth highest summit of the Rocky Mountains and the State of Colorado
Lavender Peak 13,233'
Lead Mountain (Custer County, Colorado)
Lead Mountain (Grand County, Colorado)
Leon Peak 11,240'
Little Bear Peak 14,043'
Little Cone 11,988'
Lizard Head 13,119'
Lone Cone 12,618'
Lone Eagle Peak 11,946'
Long Branch Baldy 11,982' – highest summit of the Cochetopa Hills
Long Scraggy Peak 8,796'
Longs Peak 14,259' – highest summit of the northern Front Range
Lookout Mountain 7,377'
Lookout Peak 13,661'
Marcellina Mountain 11,353'
Maroon Peak 14,163'
Matchless Mountain 12,389'
Matterhorn Peak 13,596'
McCurdy Mountain 12,172'
Mears Peak 13,496'
Menefee Peak 8,832'
Meridian Peak 12,432'
Methodist Mountain 11,713'
Middle Peak 13,306'
Missouri Mountain 14,074'
Mount Adams 13,937'
Mount Alice 13,315'
Mount Antero 14,276' – highest summit of the southern Sawatch Range
Mount Audubon 13,229'
Mount Bailey 9,089'
Mount Belford 14,203'
Mount Bierstadt 14,065'
Mount Blaurock 13,623'
Mount Bross 14,178'
Mount Buckskin 13,872'
Mount Cameron 14,245'
Mount Centennial 13,016'
Mount Chapin 12,454'
Mount Chiquita 13,075'
Mount Columbia 14,077'
Mount Democrat 14,155'
Mount Edwards 13,856'
 Mount Elbert 14,440' – highest summit of the Sawatch Range, the Rocky Mountains of North America, and the State of Colorado
Mount Emma 13,581'
Mount Emmons 12,401'
Mount Eolus 14,090'
Mount Evans (Front Range) 14,271' – highest summit of the Chicago Peaks
Mount Evans (Mosquito Range)
Mount Garfield (San Juan County, Colorado) 13,074'
Mount Guero 12,058'
Mount Gunnison 12,725'
Mount Guyot 13,376'
Mount Harvard 14,421' – highest summit of the Collegiate Peaks
Mount Herard 13,345'
Mount Hope 13,939'
Mount Ida 12,865'
Mount Jackson 13,676'
Mount Julian 12,933'
Mount Lamborn 11,402'
Mount Lincoln 14,293' – highest summit of the Mosquito Range
Mount Lindsey 14,048
Mount Logan (Garfield County, Colorado) 8,413'
Mount Massive 14,428' – second highest summit of the Rocky Mountains and the State of Colorado
Mount McConnel 8,012'
Mount Meeker 13,916'
Mount Mestas 11,573'
Mount Morrison 7,881'
Mount of the Holy Cross 14,011' – highest summit of the northern Sawatch Range
Mount Oklahoma 13,852'
Mount Oso 13,690'
Mount Ouray 13,961' – highest summit of the far southern Sawatch Range
Mount Owen 13,070' – highest summit of the Ruby Range
Mount Oxford 14,160'
Mount Parnassus 13,580'
Mount Powell 13,586' – highest summit of the Gore Range
Mount Princeton 14,204'
Mount Richthofen 12,945' – highest summit of the Never Summer Mountains
Mount Ridgway 13,468'
Mount Rosa 11,504'
Mount Shavano 14,235'
Mount Sherman 14,043'
Mount Silverheels 13,829'
Mount Sneffels 14,158' – highest summit of the Sneffels Range
Mount Sniktau 13,240'
Mount Sopris 12,958'
Mount Spalding
Mount Werner 10,570'
Mount Wilson 14,252' – highest summit of the San Miguel Mountains
Mount Yale 14,202'
Mount Zion 7,062'
Mount Zirkel 12,185' – highest summit of the Park Range
Mount Zwischen 12,011'
Mummy Mountain 13,430'
Needle Rock 7,797'
Niagara Peak 13,812'
Nokhu Crags 12,490'
North Arapaho Peak 13,508' – highest summit of the Indian Peaks
North Eolus 14,045'
North Mamm Peak 11,129'
North Maroon Peak 14,019'
North Table Mountain 6,555'
Ouray Peak 12,963'
Pacific Peak 13,957'
Palmyra Peak 13,319'
Park Cone 12,106'
Parkview Mountain 12,301' – highest summit of the Rabbit Ears Range
Parry Peak 13,397'
Peak 10 13,640'
Peak 13762 13,769'
Petit Grepon (spire) 12,305'
Pettingell Peak 13,559'
Phoenix Peak 13,902'
Pigeon Peak 13,978'
Pikes Peak 14,115' – highest summit of southern Front Range
Pilot Knob 13,738'
Piñon Mesa High Point 9,705'
Point Lookout 8,427'
Potosi Peak 13,786'
Precipice Peak 13,144'
Ptarmigan Peak 12,504' – highest summit of South Williams Fork Mountains
Puma Peak 11,575'
Pyramid Peak 14,025'
Quandary Peak 14,271' – highest summit of the Tenmile Range
Red Mountain (Culebra Range) 13,914'
Red Mountain (Never Summer Mountains)
Red Mountain Number 1 (San Juan Mountains) 12,598'
Red Mountain Number 2 (San Juan Mountains) 12,225'
Red Mountain Number 3 (San Juan Mountains) 12,896'
Red Peak (Front Range)
Red Peak (Gore Range)
Red Table Mountain 12,043'
Redcliff 13,642'
Redcloud Peak 14,041'
Rio Grande Pyramid 13,827'
Rito Alto Peak 13,803'
San Luis Peak 14,022' – highest summit of the La Garita Mountains
Sand Mountain North 10,884' – highest summit of the Elkhead Mountains
Sawtooth Mountain 12,153'
Seven Utes Mountain 11,478'
Sharkstooth Peak 11,691'
Shawnee Peak 11,932'
Sheep Mountain (Gunnison County)
Sheep Mountain (San Juan County)
Sheep Mountain (San Miguel Mountains) 13,188'
Silver King Peak 13,769'
Silver Mountain 10,525'
Silver Mountain (San Miguel County, Colorado) 13,470'
Sleepy Cat Peak 10,853'
Snowdon Peak 13,077'
Snowmass Mountain 14,099'
Snowmass Peak 13,627'
South Bald Mountain 11,009' – highest summit of the Laramie Mountains
South Bross Peak 14,027'
South River Peak 13,154'
South Table Mountain 6,338'
Specimen Mountain 12,494'
Static Peak 12,580'
Stewart Peak 13,990'
Stony Mountain 12,698'
Storm King Mountain 8,797'
Storm Peak (Front Range)
Storm Peak (San Juan Mountains)
Sugarloaf Mountain
Sultan Mountain 13,373'
Summit Peak 13,308' – highest summit of the southern San Juan Mountains
Sunlight Peak 14,065'
Sunlight Spire 14,001'
Sunshine Mountain 12,930'
Sunshine Peak 14,007'
Tabeguache Peak 14,162'
Tanks Peak 8,726'
Taylor Peak 13,158'
Teakettle Mountain 13,825'
Terra Tomah Mountain 12,718'
Terrible Mountain
The Diamond (escarpment)
The Horns (outcrop) 9,226'
The Sawtooth (arête) 13,786'
Thirtynine Mile Mountain 11,553'
Thunder Butte 9,837' – highest summit of the Rampart Range
Tijeras Peak 13,610'
Tomichi Dome 11,471'
Torreys Peak 14,274'
Tower Mountain 13,558'
Traver Peak
Treasure Mountain 13,535'
Trinity Peaks
Turret Peak 13,841'
Twilight Peak 13,163' – highest summit of the West Needle Mountains
Twin Sisters 13,432'
Twin Sisters Peaks 11,433'
Two Buttes 4,713'
Ulysses S Grant Peak 13,767'
Uncompahgre Peak 14,321' – highest summit of the San Juan Mountains
United States Mountain 13,036'
Ute Peak 9,984' – highest summit of the Ute Mountains
Vermilion Peak 13,900'
Vestal Peak 13,870' – highest summit of the Grenadier Range
Wasatch Mountain 13,555'
Waugh Mountain 11,716' – highest summit of the South Park Hills
West Beckwith Mountain 12,185'
West Buffalo Peak 13,332'
West Elk Peak 13,042' – highest summit of the West Elk Mountains
West Spanish Peak 13,631' – highest summit of the Spanish Peaks
Wetterhorn Peak 14,021'
Whetstone Mountain 12,527'
Whitehouse Mountain 13,492'
Wildhorse Peak 13,266'
Williams Peak 11,620'
Wilson Peak 14,023'
Windom Peak 14,093' – highest summit of the Needle Mountains
Windy Peak 11,970'
Winfield Peak 13,084'
Ypsilon Mountain 13,520'
Zenobia Peak 9,022' – highest summit of the far eastern Uinta Mountains

Connecticut

 Bear Mountain
 Mount Sanford
 The southern flank of Mount Frissell is the highest point of the State of Connecticut.

Delaware
 Ebright Azimuth, highest summit of the State of Delaware

District of Columbia
 Tenleytown, highest summit of the District of Columbia

Florida
 Britton Hill, highest summit of the State of Florida

Georgia

 Arabia Mountain
 Big Bald Mountain
 Black Mountain
 Blood Mountain
 Brasstown Bald, highest summit of the U.S. state of Georgia
 Coosa Bald
 Cowrock Mountain
 Currahee Mountain
 Dick's Knob
 Double Spring Knob
 Flat Top
 Glade Mountain
 Grassy Ridge
 Hightower Bald
 Horsetrough Mountain
 Kennesaw Mountain
 Levelland Mountain
 Little Kennesaw Mountain
 Lookout Mountain
 Mount Oglethorpe
 Pine Mountain
 Rabun Bald
 Rich Knob
 Rich Mountain
 Rock Mountain
 Rocky Knob
 Rocky Mountain
 Screamer Mountain
 Slaughter Mountain
 Springer Mountain
 Stone Mountain
 Sweat Mountain
 Three Sisters
 Tray Mountain
 Unicoi Range
 Wildcat Mountain
 Wolfpen Ridge
 Yonah Mountain
 Young Lick

Guam

 Mount Alifan, summit of the Island of Guam
 Mount Almagosa, summit of the Island of Guam and the 4th highest summit of the Territory of Guam
 Mount Bolanos, summit of the Island of Guam and the 3rd highest summit of the Territory of Guam
 Mount Jumullong Manglo, summit of the Island of Guam and the 2nd highest summit of the Territory of Guam
 Mount Lamlam, summit of the Island of Guam and the highest summit of the Territory of Guam

Hawaiʻi

 Haleakalā, shield volcano that is the summit of the Island of Maui
 Hualālai, shield volcano on the Island of Hawaiʻi
 Kaʻala, shield volcano that is the summit of the Island of Oʻahu
 Kamakou, shield volcano that is the summit of the Island of Molokaʻi
 Kawaikini, shield volcano that is the summit of the Island of Kauaʻi
 Kīlauea, active shield volcano on the Island of Hawaiʻi
 Kohala, shield volcano on the Island of Hawaiʻi
 Lānaʻihale, shield volcano that is the summit of the Island of Lānaʻi
 Mauna Kea, shield volcano that is the summit of the Island of Hawaiʻi, the highest summit of the State of Hawaiʻi, and the tallest mountain on Earth as measured from base to summit
 Mauna Loa, active shield volcano that is the most voluminous mountain on Earth
 Puʻu Aliʻi, summit of the Island of Molokaʻi
 Puʻu Kukui, shield volcano on the Island of Maui
 Tantalus, cinder cone on the Island of Oʻahu

Idaho

 Big Baldy
 Big Dick Point 
 Black Pine Mountains High Point
 Blizzard Mountain
 Bonneville Peak, highest summit of the Portneuf Range
 Borah Peak, highest summit of the Lost River Range and the State of Idaho
 Boulder Peak
 Buffalo Hump
 Cache Peak
 Caribou Mountain, highest summit of the Caribou Range
 Castle Peak, highest summit of the White Cloud Mountains
 Cinnabar Mountain
 Deep Creek Peak, highest summit of the Deep Creek Mountains
 Diamond Peak, highest summit of the Lemhi Range
 Doublespring Peak
 Easley Peak
 East Butte
 Elkhorn Peak
 Fishfin Ridge
 Freeman Peak
 He Devil
 Hyndman Peak, highest summit of the Pioneer Mountains
 Kings Peak
 Leatherman Peak
 Little Regret Peak
 Meade Peak, highest summit of the Peale Mountains
 Mica Peak- consists of two peaks, one in Idaho, and one in Washington.
 Middle Butte
 Monte Verita
 Mount Corruption
 Mount Cramer
 Mount Heyburn
 Mount Jefferson
 Mount McCaleb
 Mount McGuire
 Mount Morrison
 North Loon Mountain
 North Raker
 Oxford Peak, highest summit of the Bannock Range
 Queen Mountain
 Ryan Peak, highest summit of the Boulder Mountains
 Saviers Peak, highest summit of the Smoky Mountains
 Scotchman Peak
 Scott Peak
 Sedgwick Peak
 Smoky Dome, highest summit of the Soldier Mountains
 South Lost River High Point
 Stripe Mountain
 Sturgill Peak
 Thompson Peak, highest summit of the Sawtooth Mountains
 USGS Peak
 White Cap Peak
 White Mountain West
 Williams Peak

Illinois
 Charles Mound, highest summit of the State of Illinois

Indiana
 Hoosier Hill, highest summit of the State of Indiana
 Wee Wee Hill
 The Jug Rock, near Shoals, Indiana

Iowa
 Hawkeye Point, highest summit of the State of Iowa
 Loess Hills

Kansas
 Mount Sunflower, highest summit of the State of Kansas
 Flint Hills
 Red Hills
 Mount Oread
 Mount Bleu
 Well’s Overlook

Kentucky

 Black Mountain, highest summit of the Commonwealth of Kentucky
Frenchman Knob
Indian Hill (Edmonson County, Kentucky)
Whoopee Hill

Louisiana
 Driskill Mountain, highest summit of the State of Louisiana

Maine

 Cadillac Mountain, summit of Mount Desert Island
 Katahdin, highest summit of the State of Maine
 Mount Jefferson
 Mount Bigelow
 Shawnee Peak, Bridgton, Maine
 Sugarloaf Mountain

Maryland

 Backbone Mountain
 Catoctin Mountain
 Dans Mountain
 Evitts Mountain
 Hoye-Crest, highest summit of the State of Maryland
 Negro Mountain
 Polish Mountain
 Sideling Hill
 South Mountain
 Sugarloaf Mountain

Massachusetts

 Bakke Mountain
 Mount Everett
 Mount Greylock, highest summit of the Commonwealth of Massachusetts
 Mount Jefferson
 Mount Tom
 Tekoa Mountain
 Tower Mountain
 Mount Wachusett

Michigan

 Mount Arvon, highest summit of the State of Michigan
 Mount Curwood
 Mount Desor
 Huron Mountains
 Porcupine Mountains

Minnesota

 Eagle Mountain, highest summit of the State of Minnesota
 Disappointment Mountain

Mississippi
 Woodall Mountain, highest summit of the State of Mississippi

Missouri

 Bell Mountain
 Ozark Mountain
 Taum Sauk Mountain, highest summit of the State of Missouri
 Wildcat Mountain

Montana

 Ahern Peak, Glacier National Park
 Allen Mountain, Glacier National Park
 Almost-a-Dog Mountain, Glacier National Park
 Amphitheater Mountain, Glacier National Park
 Anaconda Peak, Glacier National Park
 Angel Wing, Glacier National Park
 Apikuni Mountain, Glacier National Park
 Appistoki Peak, Glacier National Park
 Argosy Mountain
 Ash Mountain
 Bad Marriage Mountain, Glacier National Park
 Baldy Mountain (Bearpaw Mountains)
 Baldy Mountain (Salish Mountains)
 Battlement Mountain, Glacier National Park
 Bear Mountain, Glacier National Park
 Bearhat Mountain, Glacier National Park
 Bearhead Mountain, Glacier National Park
 Big Baldy Mountains
 Big Pryor Mountain
 Bishops Cap, Glacier National Park
 Black Butte
 Blackfoot Mountain, Glacier National Park
 Blue Mountain
 Boulder Peak, Glacier National Park
 Brave Dog Mountain, Glacier National Park
 Calf Robe Mountain, Glacier National Park
 Campbell Mountain, Glacier National Park
 Caper Peak, Glacier National Park
 Capitol Mountain
 Castle Mountain
 Castle Reef
 Cathedral Peak, Glacier National Park
 Chapman Peak, Glacier National Park
 Charlotte Peak
 Chief Mountain, Glacier National Park
 Choteau Mountain
 Church Butte, Glacier National Park
 Citadel Mountain, Glacier National Park
 Citadel Peaks, Glacier National Park
 Clements Mountain, Glacier National Park
 Cloudcroft Peaks, Glacier National Park
 Clyde Peak, Glacier National Park
 Cracker Peak, Glacier National Park
 Crazy Peak
 Crow Peak
 Crowfeet Mountain, Glacier National Park
 Crypt Peak, Glacier National Park
 Curly Bear Mountain, Glacier National Park
 Cutoff Mountain
 Divide Mountain, Glacier National Park
 Dragons Tail, Glacier National Park
 Eagle Plume Mountain, Glacier National Park
 Eagle Ribs Mountain, Glacier National Park
 Eaglehead Mountain, Glacier National Park
 Ear Mountain
 East Flattop Mountain, Glacier National Park
 Edwards Mountain, Glacier National Park
 Electric Peak
 Elk Mountain, Glacier National Park
 Flinsch Peak, Glacier National Park
 Fusillade Mountain, Glacier National Park
 Gable Mountain, Glacier National Park
 Gable Peaks
 Gallatin Peak
 Garfield Mountain
 Goat Haunt Mountain, Glacier National Park
 Goat Mountain, Glacier National Park
 Going to the Sun Mountain, Glacier National Park
 Granite Peak, highest summit of the State of Montana
 Greathouse Peak
 Great Northern Mountain
 Grizzly Mountain, Glacier National Park
 Gunsight Mountain, Glacier National Park
 Haugan Mountain
 Haystack Butte, Glacier National Park
 Heavenly Twins
 Heavens Peak, Glacier National Park
 Highwood Baldy
 Hilgard Peak
 Holland Peak
 Hollowtop Mountain
 Homer Youngs Peak
 Iceberg Peak, Glacier National Park
 Ipasha Peak, Glacier National Park
 Jumbo Mountain, Powell County
 Kaina Mountain, Glacier National Park
 Kaiser Point, Glacier National Park
 Kinnerly Peak, Glacier National Park
 Kintla Peak, highest summit in the Livingston Range, Glacier National Park
 Kootenai Peak, Glacier National Park
 Kupunkamint Mountain, Glacier National Park
 Little Chief Mountain, Glacier National Park
 Little Dog Mountain, Glacier National Park
 Little Matterhorn, Glacier National Park
 Logging Mountain, Glacier National Park
 Lonesome Mountain
 Lone Walker Mountain, Glacier National Park
 Long Knife Peak, highest summit in the Clark Range Glacier National Park
 Longfellow Peak, Glacier National Park
 Mad Wolf Mountain, Glacier National Park
 Mahtotopa Mountain, Glacier National Park
 Matahpi Peak, Glacier National Park
 McClintock Peak, Glacier National Park
 McDonald Peak, highest summit of the Mission Mountains
 McLeod Peak
 McPartland Mountain, Glacier National Park
 Medicine Grizzly Peak, Glacier National Park
 Medicine Owl Peak, Glacier National Park
 Miche Wabun Peak, Glacier National Park
 Mount Blackmore
 Mount Brown, Glacier National Park
 Mount Cannon, Glacier National Park
 Mount Carter, Glacier National Park
 Mount Cleveland, highest summit in the Lewis Range, Glacier National Park
 Mount Custer, Glacier National Park
 Mount Despair, Glacier National Park
 Mount Doody, Glacier National Park
 Mount Edith
 Mount Ellsworth, Glacier National Park
 Mount Frazier
 Mount Geduhn, Glacier National Park
 Mount Gould, Glacier National Park
 Mount Grant
 Mount Headley
 Mount Helen, Glacier National Park
 Mount Henkel, Glacier National Park
 Mount Henry, Glacier National Park
 Mount Jackson (Montana), Glacier National Park
 Mount James, Glacier National Park
 Mount Jefferson, Bitterroot Range
 Mount Jefferson, Tobacco Root Mountains
 Mount Kipp, Glacier National Park
 Mount Logan, Glacier National Park
 Mount Merritt, Glacier National Park
 Mount Morgan, Glacier National Park
 Mount Oberlin, Glacier National Park
 Mount Peabody, Glacier National Park
 Mount Phillips, Glacier National Park
 Mount Pinchot, Glacier National Park
Mount Powell - highest summit of the Flint Creek Range
Mount Powell in Powell County, Montana
 Mount Rockwell, Glacier National Park
 Mount Saint Nicholas, Glacier National Park
 Mount Siyeh, Glacier National Park
 Mount Stimson, Glacier National Park
 Mount Thompson, Glacier National Park
 Mount Vaught, Glacier National Park
 Mount Wilbur, Glacier National Park
 Mount Wood
 Nahsukin Mountain, Glacier National Park
 Natoas Peak, Glacier National Park
 Norris Mountain, Glacier National Park
 Northwest Peak
 Numa Peak, Glacier National Park
 O'Brien Mountain
 Old Baldy
 Old Man of the Hills
 Parke Peak, Glacier National Park
 Paul Bunyans Cabin, Glacier National Park
 Penrose Peak
 Pentagon Mountain
 Peril Peak, Glacier National Park
 Piegan Mountain, Glacier National Park
 Pollock Mountain, Glacier National Park
 Porcupine Ridge, Glacier National Park
 Pyramid Peak, Glacier National Park
 Rainbow Peak, Glacier National Park
 Razoredge Mountain, Glacier National Park
 Red Crow Mountain, Glacier National Park
 Red Mountain, Glacier National Park
 Red Mountain, Lewis and Clark County
 Red Eagle Mountain, Glacier National Park
 Redhorn Peak, Glacier National Park
 Reuter Peak, Glacier National Park
 Reynolds Mountain, Glacier National Park
 Rising Wolf Mountain, Glacier National Park
 Robinson Mountain
 Rocky Mountain
 Sacagawea Peak
 Saint Joseph Peak
 Saint Mary Peak
 Sarcee Mountain, Glacier National Park
 Sawtooth Ridge
 Scenic Point, Glacier National Park
 Sentinel Mountain, Glacier National Park
 Seward Mountain, Glacier National Park
 Shaheeya Peak, Glacier National Park
 Sheep Mountain, Glacier National Park
 Sherburne Peak, Glacier National Park
 Sinopah Mountain, Glacier National Park
 Snowshoe Peak, highest summit in the Cabinet Mountains
 South Sheep Mountain
 Split Mountain, Glacier National Park
 Spot Mountain, Glacier National Park
 Square Peak, Glacier National Park
 Squaw Peak
 Stoney Indian Peaks, Glacier National Park
 Summit Mountain, Glacier National Park
 Sunset Peak
 Swiftcurrent Mountain, Glacier National Park
 Table Mountain
 The Guardhouse, Glacier National Park
 Thunderbird Mountain, Glacier National Park
 Tinkham Mountain, Glacier National Park
 Trapper Peak
 Triple Divide Peak, Glacier National Park
 Tumble Mountain
 Tweedy Mountain
 Union Mountain
 Vigil Peak, Glacier National Park
 Vulture Peak, Glacier National Park
 Wahcheechee Mountain, Glacier National Park
 Walton Mountain, Glacier National Park
 West Butte
 West Goat Peak
 White Calf Mountain, Glacier National Park
 Wolf Mountain
 Wolftail Mountain, Glacier National Park
 Wynn Mountain, Glacier National Park
 Yellow Mountain, Glacier National Park

Nebraska

 Bighorn Mountain
 Panorama Point, highest summit of the State of Nebraska
 Scotts Bluff
 Wildcat Hills

Nevada

 Arc Dome
 Boundary Peak, highest summit of the State of Nevada
 Bridge Mountain
 Granite Peak
 Harris Mountain
 Hayford Peak
 Humboldt Peak
 Keas Peak
 King Peak
 Kumiva Peak
 Lake Peak
 Liberty Peak
 Luxor Peak
 Matterhorn
 Meeker Peak
 Mount Charleston
 Mount Fitzgerald
 Mount Grafton
 Mount Houghton
 Mount Jefferson
 Mount Limbo
 Mount Moriah
 Mount Neva
 Mount Wilson
 Mummy Mountain
 Big Bald Mountain
 Little Bald Mountain
 North Schell Peak
 Old Razorback Mountain
 Pilot Peak
 Purgatory Peak
 Relay Peak
 Rose Knob Peak
 Ruby Dome
 Selenite Peak
 Snow Lake Peak
 Star Peak
 Tamarack Peak
 Thomas Peak
 Tikaboo Peak
 Tipton Peak
 Ward Mountain
 Wheeler Peak
 Worthington Peak

New Hampshire

 Mount Adams
 Mount Clay
 Mount Chocorua
 Mount Eisenhower
 Mount Jefferson
 Mount Lafayette
 Mount Madison
 Mount Monadnock
 Mount Monroe
 Mount Moosilauke
 Mount Sunapee
 Mount Washington, highest summit of the White Mountains, the State of New Hampshire, and the northeastern United States

New Jersey

 High Point, highest summit of the Kittatinny Mountains and the State of New Jersey
 Kikeout Mountain
 Pohatcong Mountain
 Mount Tammany
 Windbeam Mountain
 Ramapo Mountains

New Mexico

 Baldy Mountain, highest summit of the Cimarron Range
 Bennett Peak
 Big Hatchet Peak
 Mount Phillips
 San Antonio Mountain
 Sandia Crest
 Santa Fe Baldy
 Sierra Blanca Peak, highest summit of the Sacramento Mountains
 Mount Taylor
 Truchas Peak, highest summit of the Santa Fe Mountains
 Ute Mountain
 Venado Peak
 Mount Walter
 Wheeler Peak, highest summit of the Taos Mountains and the State of New Mexico, and the southernmost 4000 meter peak of the Rocky Mountains
 Whitewater Baldy, highest summit of the Mogollon Mountains
 Zeller Peak

New York

 Algonquin Peak
 Anthony's Nose
 Beacon Mountain
 Bear Mountain
 Breakneck Ridge
 Bull Hill
 Cascade Mountain
 Dix Mountain
 Hunter Mountain
 Kaaterskill High Peak
 Mount Adams
 Mount Colden
 Mount Colvin
 Mount Haystack
 Mount Jefferson
 Mount Marcy, highest summit of the Adirondack Mountains and the State of New York
 Mount Skylight
 North Mountain
 Porter Mountain
 Schunemunk Mountain
 Slide Mountain, highest summit of the Catskill Mountains
 Storm King Mountain
 Todt Hill, summit of Staten Island
 Whiteface Mountain
 Windham Mountain
 Wright Peak
 Giant Mountain

North Carolina

 Bee Mountain
 Beech Mountain
 Big Butt Mountain
 Big Yellow Mountain
 Black Mountains
 Blue Ridge Mountains
 Brushy Mountains
 Clingmans Dome
 Crowders Mountain
 Grandfather Mountain
 Grandmother Mountain
 Great Smoky Mountains
 Hanging Rock
 Hanging Rock State Park
 Hibriten Mountain
 King's Pinnacle
 Little Yellow Mountain
 Morrow Mountain
 Mount Jefferson
 Mount Mitchell, highest summit of the Appalachian Mountains, the State of North Carolina, and the eastern United States
 Occoneechee Mountain
 Old Butt Knob
 Peak Mountain
 Pilot Mountain
 Pixie Mountain
 Saura Mountains
 Stone Mountain
 Sugar Mountain
 Three Top Mountain
 Uwharrie Mountains
 Whiteside Mountain
 Woody's Knob

North Dakota
 White Butte, highest summit of the State of North Dakota

Northern Mariana Islands
 Agrihan — an unnamed point on the Island of Agrihan is the highest summit of the Commonwealth of the Northern Mariana Islands
 North Pagan, summit of Pagan Island

Ohio

 Campbell Hill, highest summit of the State of Ohio
Behm Mountain | Adams | OH
Black Mountain | Pickaway I OH
 Chestnuts Mountain | Pike | OH
 Daniels Mountain | Lake | OH
 Gildersleeve Mountain | Lake | OH
 Irons Mountain | Highland | OH
 Little Copperas Mountain | Ross | OH
 Little Mountain | Geauga | OH
 Maggies Mountain | Harrison | OH
 Matties Mountain | Harrison | OH
 Palmer Mountain | Pike | OH
 Palmers Mountain | Highland | OH
 Peach Mountain | Adams | OH
 Renoes Mountain | Pike | OH
 Rileys Mountain | Pike | OH
 Shepherds Mountain | Pike | OH
 Star Mountain | Pike | OH
 Tener Mountain | Adams | OH
 Wills Mountain | Harrison | OH

Oklahoma
 Black Mesa, highest summit of the State of Oklahoma
 Venado Peak

Oregon

Applegate Peak
Boccard Point
 Bonneville Mountain
 Chief Joseph Mountain
 Cornucopia Peak
 Craig Mountain
 Crane Mountain
 Cusick Mountain
 Glacier Peak
 Grizzly Mountain
 Hillman Peak
 Hogback Mountain (Klamath County)
 Hood River Mountain, Hood River County, Columbia Gorge
 Keel Mountain
 Krag Peak
 Llao Rock
 Marys Peak
 Matterhorn
 Mount Bachelor, stratovolcano
 Mount Bailey, shield volcano
 Mount Bolivar, highest summit of the Oregon Coast Range
 Mount Chinidere, Cascade Range
 Mount Defiance, in the Columbia Gorge, Cascade Range
 Mount Hood, active stratovolcano that is the highest summit of the state of Oregon
 Mount Howard
 Mount Jefferson, stratovolcano
 Mount Mazama
 Mount McLoughlin, stratovolcano
 Mount Mitchell
 Mount Tabor (Oregon), an extinct volcanic cinder cone
 Mount Thielsen
 Mount Washington, shield volcano
 Needle Point
 Newberry Volcano, shield volcano
 Pine Mountaim
 Pueblo Mountain, highest in the Pueblo Mountains
 Rogers Peak
 Sacajawea Peak, highest in the Wallowa Mountains
 Sawtooth Peak
 Shellrock Mountain Cascade Range
 South Sister
 Steens Mountain
 Three Fingered Jack, shield volcano
 Three Sisters
 Tomlike Mountain Cascade Range
 Underwood Mountain Cascade Range
 Wind Mountain Cascade Range

Pennsylvania

 Mount Ararat
 Bald Eagle Mountain
 Big Mountain
 Blue Knob
 Brush Mountain
 Butler Knob
 Camelback Mountain (Big Pocono)
 Hawk Mountain
 Martin Hill
 Miller Mountain
 Mount Davis, highest summit of the Commonwealth of Pennsylvania
 Nittany Mountain
 Pine Knob
 Schaefer Head
 Sideling Hill
 South Mountain
 Tuscarora Mountain
 Tussey Mountain
 Wills Mountain

Puerto Rico

 Cerro de Punta, the highest summit in Puerto Rico
 Cerro Doña Juana
 Cerro El Bolo
 Cerro Las Tetas
 Cerro Maravilla
 Cerro Rosa
 El Yunque
 Monte Guilarte
 Monte Jayuya
 Tres Picachos

Rhode Island
 Jerimoth Hill, highest summit of the State of Rhode Island and Providence Plantations

South Carolina
 Sassafras Mountain, highest summit of the State of South Carolina

South Dakota

 Black Elk Peak, highest summit of the Black Hills and the State of South Dakota and the easternmost 2200 meter peak of the United States
 Bear Mountain

Tennessee

 Bays Mountain
 Big Frog Mountain
 Blue Ridge Mountains
 Chilhowee Mountain
 Clinch Mountain
 Clingmans Dome, highest summit of the Great Smoky Mountains and the State of Tennessee
 Coon Butt
 Cumberland Plateau
 Frozen Head
 Gregory Bald
 Harris Mountain
 Highland Rim
 Holston Mountain
 Lookout Mountain
 Little Mountain
 Mount Chapman
 Mount Collins
 Mount Evil
 Mount Guyot
 Mount Kephart
 Mount Le Conte
 Mount Sequoyah
 Pilot Knob
 Roan High Knob
 Short Mountain
 Silers Bald
 Smoky Mountains
 Spence Field
 Tricorner Knob

Texas

 Cerro Alto Mountain
 Baldy Peak
 El Capitan
 Emory Peak, highest summit of the Chisos Mountains
 Enchanted Rock
 Guadalupe Peak, highest summit of the Guadalupe Mountains and the State of Texas
 Hairy Knob
 Needle Peak
 North Franklin Mountain
 Packsaddle Mountain
 Tackett Mountain

U.S. Minor Outlying Islands
 Navassa Island — an unnamed point on Navassa Island is the highest point of the U.S. Minor Outlying Islands

Utah

 Abajo Peak
 Abraham Peak
 Aires Butte
 Altar of Sacrifice
 Ant Hill
 Bald Mountain
 Beatty Point
 Bee Hive (peak)
 Ben Lomond Mountain (Utah)
 Boulder Mountain
 Bountiful Peak
 Box Elder Peak
 Brian Head
 Bridge Mountain
 Broken Tooth
 Bull Mountain
 The Castle
 Castle Dome
 Cathedral Mountain (Capitol Reef National Park)
 Cathedral Mountain (Zion National Park)
 Cathedral, The
 Checkerboard Mesa
 Cobb Peak
 Crazy Quilt Mesa
 Dead Horse Peak
 Deertrap Mountain
 Delano Peak
 Deseret Peak
 Dunn Benchmark
 Eagle Crags
 The East Temple
 Explorer Peak
 Ferns Nipple
 Flat Top Mountain
 Gobblers Knob
 Graham Peak
 Hayden Peak
 Haystack Peak
 Hilgard Mountain
 Ibapah Peak
 Inclined Temple
 Isaac Peak
 Ivins Mountain
 Jacob Peak
 Jenkins Peak
 Johnson Mountain
 Kesler Peak
 Kings Peak, highest summit of the Uinta Mountains, the Western Rocky Mountains, and the State of Utah
 Lady Mountain
 Logan Peak
 Meridian Tower
 Mountain of Mystery
 Mountain of the Sun
 Mount Beulah
 Mount Ellen
 Mount Ellsworth
 Mount Hillers
 Mount Holmes
 Mount Kinesava
 Mount Lovenia
 Mount Majestic
 Mount Mellenthin
 Mount Moroni
 Mount Nebo, highest summit of the Wasatch Mountains
 Mount Ogden
 Mount Olympus
 Mount Peale, highest summit of the La Sal Mountains
 Mount Pennell
 Mount Raymond
 Mount Spry
 Mount Timpanogos
 Mount Tukuhnikivatz
 Mount Waas
 Muffin Butte
 Nagunt Mesa
 Naomi Peak, highest summit of the Bear River Mountains
 Navajo Mountain
 Nippletop
 North Guardian Angel
 Observation Point
 Ostler Peak
 Pine Valley Peak
 Provo Peak
 Red Arch Mountain
 Rishel Peak
 Rotten Tooth
 Salt Benchmark, highest summit of the San Pitch Mountains
 The Sentinel
 Shunesburg Mountain
 Signal Peak (Utah)
 Smithsonian Butte
 S.O.B. Hill
 South Guardian Angel
 South Tent Mountain
 Strawberry Peak, highest summit of the Roan Cliffs
 The Sundial
 Swasey Peak
 Tabernacle Dome
 Temple Mountain
 Tetzlaff Peak
 Thousand Lake Mountain
 Timber Top Mountain
 Twin Brothers
 Twin Peaks
 American Fork Twin Peaks 
 Broads Fork Twin Peaks
 Avenues Twin Peaks
 Volcano Peak
 Wasatch Peak
 The Watchman
 The West Temple
 Willard Peak
 Window Blind Peak
 Wire Mountain
 The Witch Head
 Yard Peak

Vermont

 Burke Mountain
 Camel's Hump
 Jay Peak
 Killington Peak
 Mount Ellen
 Mount Mansfield, highest summit of the Green Mountains and the State of Vermont
 Mount Pisgah
 Stratton Mountain

Virgin Islands (U.S.)
 Bordeaux Mountain, summit of the Island of Saint John
 Crown Mountain, summit of the Island of Saint Thomas and the highest summit of the United States Virgin Islands
 Mount Eagle, summit of the Island of Saint Croix

Virginia

 Apple Orchard Mountain
 Bald Knob
 Balsam Beartown Mountain
 Beartown Mountain
 Bull Run Mountain
 Catoctin Mountain
 Clinch Mountain
 Elliott Knob
 Great North Mountain
 Hawksbill Mountain
 High Knob
 Massanutten Mountain
 Mount Jefferson
 Mount Rogers, highest summit of the Commonwealth of Virginia
 North Mountain
 Old Rag Mountain
 Peaks of Otter
 Powell Mountain
 Short Hill Mountain
 Reddish Knob
 Whitetop Mountain

Washington

 Abercrombie Mountain
 Abiel Peak
 Adelaide Peak
 Agnes Mountain
 Alaska Mountain
 Alta Mountain
 American Border Peak
 Amphitheater Mountain
 Antler Peak
 Apex Mountain
 Argonaut Peak
 Aries
 Arrowhead Mountain
 Athena
 Azurite Peak
 Bacon Peak
 Bald Eagle Peak
 Bandit Peak
 Bear Mountain
 Bearcat Ridge
 Bearpaw Mountain
 Bears Breast Mountain
 Bedal Peak
 Beebe Mountain
 Bessemer Mountain
 Big Bear Mountain
 Big Chiwaukum
 Big Craggy Peak
 Big Devil Peak
 Big Jim Mountain
 Big Kangaroo
 Big Lou
 Big Snow Mountain
 Bills Peak
 Bismarck Peak
 Black Mountain
 Black Peak
 Blackbeard Peak
 Blue Lake Peak
 Blue Mountain
 Bonanza Peak
 Boston Peak
 Boulder Ridge
 Brahma Peak
 Buck Mountain
 Buckner Mountain
 Bulls Tooth
 Burnt Boot Peak
 Burroughs Mountain
 Cadet Peak
 Colquhoun Peak
 Camp Robber Peak
 Cape Horn
 Cardinal Peak
 Carne Mountain
 Cascade Peak
 Cashmere Mountain
 Castle Mountain
 Castle Peak
 Castle Rock (Chelan County)
 Cathedral Peak
 Cathedral Rock
 Cat Peak
 Chair Peak
 Chikamin Peak
 Chilly Peak
 Chimney Peak
 Chiwawa Mountain
 Chutla Peak
 Cirque Mountain
 Cloudy Peak
 Colchuck Balanced Rock
 Colchuck Peak
 Coldwater Peak
 Colonial Peak
 Constitution Crags
 Copper Mountain (Mason County, Washington)
 Copper Mountain (Pierce County, Washington)
 Copper Peak
 Corteo Peak
 Courtney Peak
 Cowboy Mountain
 Crater Mountain
 Crescent Mountain
 Crooked Bum
 Crystal Peak
 Crystal Peak (Olympic Mountains)
 Cutthroat Peak
 Damnation Peak
 Davis Peak
 Del Campo Peak
 Denny Mountain
 Desolation Peak
 Devils Peak
 Devils Thumb
 Devore Peak
 Dip Top Peak
 Dodger Point
 Dog Mountain
 Dome Peak
 Dorado Needle
 Dragontail Peak
 Dumbell Mountain
 Dungeon Peak
 Earl Peak
 Early Morning Spire
 Early Winters Spires
 Easy Peak
 Edward Peak
 Eightmile Mountain
 Eldorado Peak
 Electric Butte
 Elephant Butte
 Elija Ridge
 Elk Mountain (Clallam County, Washington)
 Emerald Peak
 Esmeralda Peaks
 Fay Peak
 Fifth of July Mountain
 Finney Peak
 Fisher Peak
 Forbidden Peak, in North Cascades National Park
 Fortune Peak
 Four Brothers
 French Cabin Mountain
 Frisco Mountain
 Gabriel Peak
 Garfield Mountain
 Genesis Peak
 Gilbert Peak
 Gilhooley Tower
 Glacier Peak, stratovolcano, highest point of Snohomish County
 Glee Peak
 Glory Mountain
 Goat Island Mountain
 Golden Horn
 Goode Mountain
 Gothic Peak
 Granite Mountain (Wenatchee Mountains)
 Granite Mountain (Whatcom County, Washington)
 Gray Peak
 Graybeard Peak
 Green Mountain (King County, Washington)
 Green Mountain (Snohomish County, Washington)
 Grindstone Mountain
 Gunn Peak
 Guye Peak
 Hagan Mountain
 Half Moon (Washington)
 Hal Foss Peak
 Hall Peak
 Hannegan Peak
 Harding Mountain
 Hawkins Mountain
 Helmet Butte
 Hibox Mountain
 Hidden Lake Peaks
 Himmelhorn
 Hinkhouse Peak
 Hock Mountain
 Holliway Mountain
 Hoodoo Peak
 Hozomeen Mountain
 Huckleberry Mountain
 Humpback Mountain
 Hurricane Hill
 Ice Box
 Icy Peak
 Indecision Peak
 Indian Head Peak
 Indian Mountain
 Ingalls Peak
 Inner Constance
 Inspiration Peak
 Iron Cap Mountain
 Iron Mountain (Jefferson County, Washington)
 Iron Mountain (Pierce County, Washington)
 Jack Mountain
 Jackita Ridge
 Jefferson Peak
 Jim Hill Mountain
 Johannesburg Mountain
 Johnson Mountain (Washington)
 Jove Peak
 Jumbo Mountain
 Jumbo Peak
 Kaleetan Peak
 Kamiak Butte
 Kelly Butte
 Kimtah Peak
 Kitling Peak
 Klawatti Peak
 Kololo Peaks
 Krell Hill
 Kyes Peak
 La Bohn Peak
 Labyrinth Mountain
 Ladies Peak
 Lane Peak
 Le Conte Mountain
 Liberty Bell Mountain
 Liberty Mountain
 Lichtenberg Mountain
 Little Big Chief Mountain
 Little Devil Peak
 Little Jack
 Little Tahoma Peak
 Logger Butte
 Lookout Mountain
 Lost Peak
 Lost Peak (Jefferson County, Washington)
 Luahna Peak
 Ludden Peak
 Luna Peak
 Mac Peak
 Magic Mountain
 Maiden Peak
 Mailbox Peak
 Majestic Mountain
 Malachite Peak
 Mantis Peak
 Maple Mountain
 Marcus Peak
 Martin Peak
 Martin Peak (Methow Mountains)
 Martin Peak (Olympic Mountains)
 McCartney Peak
 McClellan Butte
 McGregor Mountain
 McKay Ridge
 McMillan Spire
 McNeeley Peak
 Merchant Peak
 Mesahchie Peak
 Mica Peak, consists of two peaks, one in Idaho, and one in Washington.
 Middle Peak
 Mineral Mountain
 Minnie Peak
 Mix-up Peak
 Monument Peak
 Moolock Mountain
 Morning Star Peak
 Mother Lode
 Mother Mountain
 Mount Adams, stratovolcano
 Mount Aix
 Mount Anderson
 Mount Ann
 Mount Appleton
 Mount Arriva
 Mount Baker, active stratovolcano, highest point of Whatcom County
 Mount Ballard
 Mount Baring
 Mount Barnes
 Mount Benzarino
 Mount Berge
 Mount Blum, in North Cascades National Park
 Mount Bretherton
 Mount Buckindy
 Mount Bullen
 Mount Cameron
 Mount Carrie
 Mount Carru
 Mount Challenger
 Mount Chardonnay
 Mount Chaval
 Mount Childs
 Mount Christie
 Mount Clark
 Mount Claywood
 Mount Constance
 Mount Constitution, summit of Orcas Island
 Mount Crowder
 Mount Cruiser
 Mount Dana
 Mount Daniel, highest point of King County
 Mount David
 Mount Deception
 Mount Defiance
 Mount Degenhardt
 Mount Delabarre
 Mount Despair
 Mount Dickerman
 Mount Elk Lick
 Mount Erie, summit of Fidalgo Island
 Mount Fairchild
 Mount Fernow
 Mount Fernow (King County, Washington)
 Mount Ferry
 Mount Fitzhenry
 Mount Forgotten
 Mount Formidable
 Mount Fricaba
 Mount Fromme
 Mount Fury
 Mount Hardy
 Mount Henderson
 Mount Hermann
 Mount Higgins
 Mount Horrible
 Mount Howard
 Mount Index
 Mount Johnson
 Mount Jupiter
 Mount Kent
 Mount Kit Carson
 Mount La Crosse
 Mount Larrabee
 Mount Lago
 Mount Lena
 Mount Lincoln
 Mount Logan
 Mount Margaret
 Mount Mathias
 Mount Maude
 Mount Meany
 Mount Misch
 Mount Mitchell
 Mount Mystery
 Mount Norton
 Mount Noyes
 Mount Olympus, highest summit of Olympic Mountains
 Mount Pershing
 Mount Persis
 Mount Pilchuck
 Mount Prophet
 Mount Pugh
 Mount Pulitzer
 Mount Queets
 Mount Rainier, active stratovolcano that is the highest summit of the Cascade Mountains and Washington state
 Mount Redoubt
 Mount Roosevelt
 Mount Rose
 Mount Ross
 Mount Saul
 Mount Scott
 Mount Seattle
 Mount Sefrit
 Mount Shuksan
 Mount Si
 Mount Spickard
 Mount Spokane
 Mount St. Helens, active stratovolcano that erupted violently on 1980-05-18
 Mount Steel
 Mount Stone
 Mount Stuart
 Mount Terror
 Mount Thomson
 Mount Tom
 Mount Tommy Thompson
 Mount Torment
 Mount Triumph
 Mount Walkinshaw
 Mount Washington (Cascades)
 Mount Washington
 Mount Watson
 Mount Whittier
 Mount Wilder
 Mount Winthrop
 Mount Worthington
 Mount Wow
 Mox Peaks
 Muncaster Mountain
 Napeequa Peak
 Navaho Peak
 Nodoubt Peak
 North Big Bosom Butte
 North Gardner Mountain
 North Lookout Mountain, known locally as Galbraith Mountain
 North Star Mountain
 Obstruction Peak
 Old Desolate
 O'Neil Peak
 Oregon Butte
 Osceola Peak
 Painted Mountain
 Palisades Peak 
 Paul Bunyans Stump
 Pasayten Peak
 Pelton Peak
 Perdition Peak
 Petunia Peak
 Pica Peak
 Pierce Mountain
 Pinnacle Mountain
 Pinnacle Peak (King County, Washington)
 Pinnacle Peak (Lewis County, Washington)
 Pinnacle Peak (Whatcom County, Washington)
 Piro's Spire
 Plummer Peak
 Plummer Mountain
 Pocket Peak
 Porcupine Peak
 Prairie Mountain
 Pyramid Peak (Pierce County, Washington)
 Pyramid Peak (Whatcom County, Washington)
 Rainy Peak
 Rampart Ridge (Washington)
 Rattlesnake Mountain
 Rattlesnake Ridge
 Red Mountain (Skagit County, Washington)
 Remmel Mountain
 Repulse Peak
 Rhino Butte
 Riddle Peaks
 Robinson Mountain
 Rock Mountain
 Rocky Peak
 Ruby Mountain
 Ruth Mountain
 Ruth Peak
 Sahale Mountain
 Saska Peak
 Sauk Mountain
 Scorpion Mountain
 Sentinel Peak
 Sentinel Peak (Jefferson County, Washington)
 Seven Fingered Jack
 Seymour Peak
 Sharkfin Tower
 Sheep Mountain (Okanogan County, Washington)
 Sheep Mountain
 Sherman Peak
 Sherpa Peak
 Silver Eagle Peak
 Silver Star Mountain, in Okanogan County
 Silvertip Peak
 Sitting Bull Mountain
 Skagit Peak
 Skykomish Peak
 Skyscraper Mountain
 Slate Peak
 Sleeping Beauty
 Sloan Peak
 Sluiskin Mountain
 Snoqualmie Mountain
 Snowfield Peak
 Snowgrass Mountain
 Snowking Mountain
 Sourdough Mountain
 Spark Plug Mountain
 Spectacle Buttes
 Sperry Peak
 Spider Mountain
 Spire Mountain
 Spratt Mountain
 Stephen Peak
 Steptoe Butte
 Styloid Peak
 Summit Chief Mountain
 Sundial
 Sunrise Peak
 Surprise Mountain
 Switchback Peak
 Syncline Mountain
 Tahtlum Peak
 Tatie Peak
 Teanaway Peak
 Tekoa Mountain
 Tenpeak Mountain
 Terrace Mountain
 The Brothers
 The Chopping Block
 The Cradle
 The Dome
 The Needles
 The Pulpit
 The Roost
 The Temple
 The Triad
 Three Brothers
 Three Fingers
 Three Queens
 Three Wives
 Thunder Mountain
 Tiffany Mountain
 Tinkham Peak
 Tolmie Peak
 Tomyhoi Peak
 Trapper Mountain
 Trappers Peak
 Trico Mountain
 Tricouni Peak
 Tumtum Peak
 Tupshin Peak
 Twin Needles
 Twin Sisters Mountain
 Twisp Mountain
 Tyler Peak
 Underwood Mountain
 Unicorn Peak
 Unicorn Peak, (Olympic Mountains)
 Wallaby Peak
 Warrior Peak
 Wedge Mountain
 Welch Peaks
 West Peak
 Whatcom Peak
 Whistler Mountain
 Witches Tower
 White Chuck Mountain
 White Goat Mountain
 White Mountain (Olympic Mountains)
 White Mountain
 Whitehorse Mountain
 Whittier Peak
 Wild Goat Peak
 Wilmans Peaks
 Wind Mountain
 Windy Peak
 Woden
 Wright Mountain
 Yakima Peak
 Yellow Aster Butte

West Virginia

 Baker Mountain
 Bald Knob
 Cacapon Mountain
 Cheat Mountain
 Cooper Mountain
 Great North Mountain
 Knobly Mountain
 Little Cacapon Mountain
 Mill Creek Mountain
 Mount Porte Crayon
 Nathaniel Mountain
 North Mountain
 North River Mountain
 Patterson Creek Mountain
 Reddish Knob
 Saddle Mountain
 Sideling Hill
 Sleepy Creek Mountain
 South Branch Mountain
 Spring Gap Mountain
 Spruce Knob, highest summit of the Allegheny Mountains and the State of West Virginia
 Third Hill Mountain

Wisconsin

 Baraboo Range
 Blue Mounds, highest summit of the Ocooch Mountains
 Belmont Mound, (Ocooch Mountains)
 Mount Pisgah
 Platte Mound, (Ocooch Mountains)
 Wildcat Mountain 
 Ocooch Mountains, highest and most rugged part of the Driftless Area of the upper Midwest.
 Penokee Mountains, an ancient heavily eroded mountain range spanning northern Wisconsin and Michigan
 Rib Mountain
 Timms Hill, highest summit of the State of Wisconsin

Wyoming

 Amphitheater Mountain
 Atlantic Peak
 Bastion Peak
 Bivouac Peak
 Black Tooth Mountain
 Bollinger Peak
 Bomber Mountain
 Brown Cliff North
 Buck Mountain
 Bunsen Peak
 Carter Mountain
 Casper Mountain
 Cedar Mountain
 Cloud Peak, highest summit of the Big Horn Mountains and the northernmost 4000 meter peak of the Rocky Mountains
 Cloudveil Dome
 Disappointment Peak
 Doane Peak
 Doublet Peak
 Doubletop Peak
 Eagle Peak, highest summit of Yellowstone National Park
 Eagles Rest Peak
 Elk Mountain (Carbon County, Wyoming)
 Elk Mountain (Teton County, Wyoming)
 Ferris Mountain
 Forellen Peak
 Fossil Mountain
 Francs Peak
 Fremont Peak
 Gannett Peak, highest summit of the Wind River Range, the Central Rocky Mountains, and the State of Wyoming
 Garfield Peak
 Grand Teton, highest summit of the Teton Range and the westernmost 4000 meter peak of the Rocky Mountains
 Gray Peak
 Harrower Peak
 Haystack Mountain
 Heart Mountain
 Hoodoo Peak
 Jackson Peak
 Laramie Peak
 Lizard Head Peak
 Medicine Bow Peak
 Middle Teton
 Missouri Buttes
 Mount Febbas
 Mount Fitzpatrick, highest summit of the Salt River Range
 Mount Helen
 Mount Lester
 Mount Moran
 Mount Nystrom
 Mount Owen
 Mount Sacagawea
 Mount Saint John
 Mount Warren
 Mount Washburn
 Mount Wister
 Mount Woodring
 Mount Woodrow Wilson
 Nez Perce Peak
 Owl Peak
 Penrose Peak
 Pollux Peak
 Ramshorn Peak
 Ranger Peak
 Raynolds Peak
 Rendezvous Mountain
 Republic Mountain
 Rockchuck Peak
 Rolling Thunder Mountain
 Saddle Mountain
 Schiestler Peak
 Signal Mountain
 Silvertip Peak
 South Teton
 Spider Peak
 Squaretop Mountain
 Static Peak
 Steeple Peak
 Sublette Mountain, highest summit of the Southern Wyoming Overthrust Belt
 Symmetry Spire
 Teepe Pillar
 Teewinot Mountain
 Thor Peak
 Tongue Butte
 Top Notch Peak
 Traverse Peak
 Trout Peak
 Wapiti Ridge
 White Rock
 Wind River Peak
 Wyoming Peak, highest summit of the Wyoming Range
 Younts Peak

Summit disambiguation
The following list includes links to disambiguation and set index articles for topographic summits of the United States with identical names. The United States Board on Geographic Names is the official authority for all United States geographic names. The United States Geological Survey Geographic Names Information System provides Internet access to these geographic names.

 Bald Eagle Mountain – 7 summits in 6 states
 Bald Knob – 142 summits in 30 states
 Bald Mountain – 303 summits in 31 states
 Baldy Mountain – 56 summits in 17 states
 Baldy Peak – 19 summits in 12 states
 Bear Mountain – 144 summits in 30 states
 Black Butte – 113 summits in 14 states
 Black Mesa – 41 summits in 7 states
 Black Mountain – 266 summits in 29 states
 Boundary Peak – 8 summits in 7 states
 Camelback Mountain – 9 summits in 6 states
 Campbell Hill – 20 summits in 15 states
 Capitol Peak – 6 summits in 5 states
 Castle Peak – 24 summits in 10 states
 Cloud Peak – 4 summits in Alaska, Michigan, and Wyoming
 Crater Peak – 8 summits in 7 states
 Crown Mountain – 6 summits in 5 states and a summit in a territory
 Diamond Peak – 22 summits in 11 states
 Eagle Mountain – 41 summits in 20 states
 Eagle Peak – 44 summits in 15 states
 El Capitan – 6 summits in 5 states
 Elk Mountain – 60 summits in 14 states
 Flat Top Mountain – 41 summits in 18 states
 Fremont Peak – 7 summits in 5 states
 Glass Mountain – 3 summits in California and a summit in Oregon
 Granite Mountain – 57 summits in 17 states
 Granite Peak – 42 summits in 12 states
 Grizzly Peak – 22 summits in 7 states
 High Point – 43 summits in 19 states
 Humboldt Peak – 3 summits in California, Colorado, and Nevada
 King Peak – 3 summits in Arizona, California, and Nevada
 Kings Peak – 2 summits in Idaho and Utah
 Lookout Mountain – 113 summits in 28 states
 Matterhorn – 3 summits in Arizona, Nevada, and Oregon
 Mount Adams – 7 summits in 6 states
 Mount Bailey – 2 summits in Colorado and Oregon
 Mount Baldy 22 summits in 13 states
 Mount Cleveland – 4 summits in Alaska, Montana, and Vermont
 Mount Dana – 3 summits in Alaska, California, and Washington
 Mount Davis – 7 summits in 5 states
 Mount Douglas – 2 summits in Alaska and a summit in Montana
 Mount Ellen – 2 summits in Utah and Vermont
 Mount Hood – 3 summits in California, Massachusetts, and Oregon
 Mount Hopkins – 2 summits in Arizona and California
 Mount Jackson – 10 summits in 7 states
 Mount Jefferson – 10 summits in 10 states
 Mount Kimball – 3 summits in Alaska, Arizona, and Colorado
 Mount Lincoln – 8 summits in 7 states
 Mount Marcy – 4 summits in 4 states
 Mount Michelson – 2 summits in Alaska
 Mount Mitchell – 3 summits in North Carolina, Oregon, and Washington
 Mount Morgan – 5 summits in 4 states
 Mount Nebo – 28 summits in 20 states
 Mount Owen – 5 summits in 4 states
 Mount Powell – 5 summits in 5 states
 Mount Russell – a summit in Alaska and 2 summits in California
 Mount Sanford – 2 summits in Alaska and Connecticut
 Mount Steller – 2 summits in Alaska
 Mount Taylor – 2 summits in Nevada and New Mexico
 Mount Tom – 44 summits in 18 states
 Mount Warren – 5 summits in 5 states
 Mount Washington – 14 summits in 10 states and a summit in a territory
 Mount Wilson – 11 summits in 8 states
 Mummy Mountain – 5 summits in 5 states
 North Mountain – 25 summits in 16 states
 Mount Olympus – 9 summits in 8 states
 Pyramid Peak – 45 summits in 11 states
 Red Mountain – 160 summits in 21 states
 Rocky Mountain – 46 summits in 22 states
 Slide Mountain – 26 summits in 13 states
 Split Mountain – 12 summits in 8 states
 Stone Mountain – 31 summits in 15 states
 Storm King Mountain – 5 summits in Colorado, New York, and Washington
 Thompson Peak – 16 summits in 7 states
 Three Sisters – 17 summits in 10 states
 Treasure Mountain – 10 summits in 6 states
 Twin Peak – 6 summits in 4 states
 Twin Peaks – 106 summits in 18 states
 University Peak – 2 summits in Alaska and California
 Wheeler Peak – 6 summits in 4 states
 White Mountain – 44 summits in 19 states
 Wildcat Mountain – 43 summits in 22 states

See also

Outline of the United States
Index of United States-related articles
 Mountain peaks of North America
 Mountain peaks of the United States
 Table of the highest major summits of the United States
 Table of the ultra-prominent summits of the United States
 Table of the most isolated major summits of the United States
 Mountain peaks of Alaska
 Mountain peaks of California
 Mountain peaks of Colorado
 Mountain peaks of Hawaii
 Fourteener
 Geography of the United States
 Geology of the United States of America
 List of U.S. states by elevation
 Lists of mountains by region
 List of Ultras of the United States
 physical geography
 summit (topography)
 topographic elevation
 topographic isolation
 topographic prominence
 topography
 :Category:Mountains of the United States
 commons:Category:Mountains of the United States

References

External links

 National Geodetic Survey (NGS)
 NGS Datasheets
 NGVD 29 to NAVD 88 online elevation converter
 Geodetic Glossary
 United States Geological Survey (USGS)
 Geographic Names Information System
 Peakbagger.com
 PeakList.org
 SummitPost.org
 World Mountain Encyclopedia PeakWare.com
 Interactive elevation profile chart of the continental US.

 
United States geography-related lists by state
United States geography-related lists